The Starr Affair is a 1954 book written by Jean Overton Fuller. It was published by Victor Gollancz.

It tells the story John Renshaw Starr, an officer of the British Special Operations Executive sent to establish the Acrobat Network in north-eastern France during the Second World War. He was subsequently captured, tortured and imprisoned in Fresnes prison, at 84 Avenue Foch and in Sachsenhausen and Mauthausen concentration camps.

It is based on the subject's own account of his activities, captivity and survival and the subsequent investigations concerning his suspected collaboration with the enemy.

Notes

1954 British novels
Novels set during World War II
Victor Gollancz Ltd books